The middleweight was one of five boxing weight classes contested on the boxing at the 1908 Summer Olympics programme. Like all other boxing events, it was open only to men. The boxing competitions were all held on October 27. The middleweight was the second-heaviest class, allowing boxers of up to 158 pounds (71.7 kg). It was the only boxing event in which a non-British boxer won a bout. Reginald Baker from Australia (competing on the Australasia team) won three before losing to Johnny Douglas in the final. Ten boxers from three nations competed. Each NOC could enter up to 12 boxers. Australasia entered 1 boxer; France entered 5 boxers, 2 of whom withdrew; and Great Britain entered 6 boxers.

Competition format

There were three rounds in each bout, with the first two rounds being three minutes long and the last one going four minutes. Two judges scored the match, giving 5 points to the better boxer in each of the first two rounds and 7 to the better boxer in the third round. Marks were given to the other boxer in proportion to how well he did compared to the better. If the judges were not agreed on a winner at the end of the bout, the referee could either choose the winner or order a fourth round.

Results

Bracket

Did not start: S. de Néve and J. Oudin of France

Round of 16

The first round was characterized by knockouts, as all three Frenchmen as well as Dees were out before the start of the third round.  Aspa managed to make it through two rounds before withdrawing due to a thumb injury.  Doudelle went down the quickest, in the first round, while Dees and Morard were bested in the second rounds of their bouts.  The one bout that did go all the way was between Philo and Murdoch, which was such a tight contest that the referee had to break the judges' tie.

Quarterfinals

Philo, Warnes, and Douglas all had byes in the second round. Baker and Childs had the only quarterfinal match. The Australian hit Childs with a powerful uppercut as well as managing to avoid a charge by Childs that caused the Briton to fall through the ropes. In a clear decision, Baker advanced to the semifinals.

Semifinals

Both semifinal contests were knockouts, bringing the middleweight event to a total of 6 knockouts to 2 decisions. Baker defeated Philo quickly, while Douglas took two rounds to put Warnes away.

Final

In a match that had the potential to break England's dominance of the boxing championships, Baker and Douglas went through a middleweight final that the Official Report described as the "best boxing of the day" (and therefore the entire 1908 Olympic boxing competition). The two fought well, with Douglas's knockdown of Baker in the second a major factor in the Briton's win.

Standings

References

Sources
 Official Report of the Games of the IV Olympiad (1908).
 De Wael, Herman. Herman's Full Olympians: "Boxing 1908". Accessed 8 April 2006.

Middleweight